Staffordshire/Warwickshire 1 was a tier 9 English Rugby Union league with teams from Staffordshire and Warwickshire taking part.  Promoted teams moved up to Midlands West 2 and relegated teams dropped to either Staffordshire 1 or Warwickshire 1.  The division was cancelled at the end of the 1999–00 campaign due to nationwide league restructuring by the RFU, with the majority of teams transferred into the newly introduced Midlands 4 West (North) or Midlands 4 West (South).

Original teams
When league rugby began in 1987 this division (known as Staffordshire/Warwickshire) contained the following teams:

Bedworth
Handsworth
Kenilworth
Leek
Newcastle (Staffs)
Nuneaton Old Edwardians
Old Leamingtonians
Old Longtonians
Stoke Old Boys
Stratford-upon-Avon
Willenhall

Staffordshire/Warwickshire 1 honours

Staffordshire/Warwickshire (1987–1992)

The original Staffordshire/Warwickshire was a tier 7 league with promotion up to Midlands 2 West and relegation down to either Staffordshire 1 or Warwickshire 1.

Staffordshire/Warwickshire 1 (1992–1993)

Merging of the Staffordshire and Warwickshire leagues would lead to the division being renamed as Staffordshire/Warwickshire 1 and would drop to being a tier 9 league.  Promotion was now to the newly introduced Midlands West 2 and relegation to Staffordshire/Warwickshire 2.

Staffordshire/Warwickshire 1 (1993–1996)

The top six teams from Midlands 1 and the top six from North 1 were combined to create National 5 North, meaning that Staffordshire/Warwickshire 1 dropped to become a tier 10 league.  Promotion continued to Midlands West 2 and relegation to Staffordshire/Warwickshire 2.

Staffordshire/Warwickshire 1 (1996–2000)

At the end of the 1995–96 season National 5 North was discontinued and Staffordshire/Warwickshire 1 returned to being a tier 9 league.  Promotion continued to Midlands West 2 and relegation to Staffordshire/Warwickshire 2.  At the end of the 1999–00 the league was discontinued due to RFU restructuring.

Number of league titles

Bedworth (1)
Berkswell & Balsall (1)
Broadstreet (1)
Dunlop (1)
Handsworth (1)
Keresley (1)
Leamington (1)
Manor Park (1)
Newcastle (Staffs) (1)
Old Coventrians (1)
Old Longtonians (1)
Silhillians (1)
Stoke Old Boys (1)

Notes

See also
Staffordshire/Warwickshire 2
Staffordshire/Warwickshire 3
Staffordshire/Warwickshire 4
Midlands RFU
Staffordshire RU
Warwickshire RFU
English rugby union system
Rugby union in England

References

9
Rugby union in Staffordshire
Rugby union in Warwickshire
Sports leagues established in 1987
Sports leagues disestablished in 2000